Archimedes Geo3D is a software package for dynamic geometry in three dimensions. It was released in Germany in March 2006 and won a German government award for outstanding educational software in 2007 .

Advanced features

Archimedes Geo3D can trace the movement of points, lines, segments, and circles and generate locus lines and surfaces. Arbitrary objects can be intersected with lines, locus lines, and planes.

References

External links
Archimedes Geo3D home page
Building a projection in Archimedes Geo3D
Building a double cone in Archimedes Geo3D

Interactive geometry software